The GAA Hurling All-Ireland Under-20 (previously Under-21) B Championship, the second tier competition in hurling is an annual series of games for male players under the age of 20 and is organized by the Gaelic Athletic Association (GAA). The 2019 competition was the first at the Under 20 age level.

The final is currently played in April or May and the winning county receive the Richie McElligott Cup, which is named in honour of the late great Kerry stalwart Richie McElligott of the Lixnaw club and was first presented in 2015.

The championship is played on a straight knockout basis whereby once a team loses they are eliminated.

Teams that are deemed ineligible or "too weak" for the GAA Hurling All-Ireland Under-21 Championship participate in the B championship. It is one of the few All-Ireland championships not to be run on a provincial basis.

Down are the current holders having beaten Roscommon in the 2022 final at Breffni Park in Cavan, on a 2-15 to 0-15 scoreline. It is Down's first title at this grade The 2020 competition was not held due to the COVID-19 pandemic..

Qualification

The GAA Hurling All-Ireland Under-20 B Championship features eight teams in the final tournament. Seven teams gain automatic entry to the All-Ireland quarter-final stages while the winners of the GAA Hurling All-Ireland Under-20 C Championship make up the eight quarter-final teams.

Finals listed by year

Wins listed by county

External links
 Official GAA website

References

All-Ireland inter-county hurling championships
!